The Very Best of Johnny Hates Jazz is Johnny Hates Jazz’s first of two compilation albums.  Released in May 1993, the majority of the album concentrates on songs from the band’s debut album, although the b-sides from several of the major singles on that album, the non-album single "Turn the Tide," and a few songs from the band’s lesser known second album Tall Stories, are included on the compilation as well.

Track listing
1993 original compact disc release (CDVIP 119)
"Shattered Dreams" – 3:29 (Clark Datchler)
"My Secret Garden" – 3:19 (Calvin Hayes and Mike Nocito)
"Me and My Foolish Heart" – 3:29 (Calvin Hayes, I. MacDonald, Mike Nocito, and Phil Thornalley)
"Living in the Past" – 3:36 (Calvin Hayes and Mike Nocito)
"I Don't Want to Be a Hero" – 3:27 (Clark Datchler)
"The Cage" – 4:00 (Calvin Hayes and Mike Nocito)
"Turn the Tide" – 3:44 (Cutler, Murrel, and Phil Thornalley)
"Heart of Gold" – 3:28 (Clark Datchler)
"Don't Say It's Love" – 3:46 (Clark Datchler)
"Let Me Change Your Mind Tonight" – 4:45 (Phil Thornalley)
"Last to Know" – 3:36 (Phil Thornalley)
"Fool's Gold" – 4:31 (Calvin Hayes, Mike Nocito, and Phil Thornalley)
"Shattered Dreams (12" Extended Mix)" – 5:12 (Clark Datchler)
"Turn the Tide (Rogue Vogue Mix)" – 5:03 (Cutler, Murrell, and Phil Thornalley)
"Cracking Up" – 3:41 (Calvin Hayes and Mike Nocito)
"Turn Back the Clock" – 4:20 (Clark Datchler)

Notes
 My Secret Garden – Originally released as "Shattered Dreams" B-side VS 948
 Living in the Past – Originally released as "Me and My Foolish Heart" B-side RAK 388
 The Cage – Originally released as "I Don't Want to be A Hero" B-side  VS 1000
 Shattered Dreams (12" Extended Mix) – Originally released as VS 948-12
 Turn the Tide – Originally Released as non album single in 1989 VST 1205
 Turn the Tide (Rogue Vogue Mix) – Included on VST 1205
 Cracking Up – Originally released as "Turn back the Clock" B-side VS 1017

References

1993 greatest hits albums
Johnny Hates Jazz albums